Thomas F. Allgood (September 10, 1928 – August 4, 2000) was an American politician. He served as a Democratic member for the 22nd district of the Georgia State Senate.

Life and career 
Allgood was born in Richmond County, Georgia. He served in the United States Army for a year. After that, Allgood attended Augusta University and Emory University School of Law, receiving two law degrees.

Allgood was an attorney. In 1977, he was elected to represent the 22nd district of the Georgia State Senate and became majority leader in 1981. He left office in 1991 when he retired.

Allgood died in August 2000 in a plane crash, at the age of 71, along with his wife, Thelma and his pilot, Steve Patterson.

References 

1928 births
2000 deaths
People from Richmond County, Georgia
Democratic Party Georgia (U.S. state) state senators
20th-century American politicians
Augusta University alumni
Emory University School of Law alumni
Accidental deaths in Georgia (U.S. state)
Victims of aviation accidents or incidents in 2000
Victims of aviation accidents or incidents in the United States